Paul Reynolds (born 6 February 1970) is an English actor, well known for portraying Colin Mathews in Press Gang (1989–1993), Kelvin Raine in Maisie Raine (1998) and convicted police murderer Chris Craig in Let Him Have It (1991).

Early life
Reynolds was born in Wanstead, London, and attended the Sylvia Young Theatre School.

Career
Reynolds' breakthrough role on television came playing Thatcherite Colin Mathews in the BAFTA award-winning ITV series Press Gang. His career continued with the roles of Kevin in The Ghostbusters of East Finchley, and Sammy Dobbs, the unscrupulous sports agent, in Andy Hamilton's Trevor's World of Sport.

On the big screen, Reynolds portrayed Christopher Craig opposite Christopher Eccleston's Derek Bentley in Let Him Have It and the mischievous Matt in Croupier alongside Clive Owen.

In later years, Reynolds made appearances as Squeak in Absolutely Fabulous alongside Julia Sawalha, his Press Gang co-star. In 2008, he also made a cameo appearance in Lark Rise to Candleford, again with Julia Sawalha.

As well as many TV, film and radio appearances, Reynolds has appeared on stage in leading roles at The National Theatre, The Royal Court, The Almeida and The Bristol Old Vic portraying Baby in Mojo and Eugene in Neil Simon's Brighton Beach Memoirs.

Reynolds also spent ten years in the BBC World Service radio drama Westway playing Fizza.

In 2005 Reynolds had a break from acting to set up his own production company called Remould Media which specialised in filming concerts as well as developing TV and film scripts and ideas. He currently conducts his own production work.

He starred in Lucky You, a stage adaptation of Carl Hiaasen's novel of the same title which premiered at the 2008 Edinburgh Festival Fringe.

Selected filmography

Film

Television

References

External links

English male film actors
English male television actors
People from Wanstead
1970 births
Living people